Arthur Stoll (8 January 1887 – 13 January 1971) was a Swiss biochemist.

Education and career
The son of a teacher and school headmaster, he studied chemistry at the ETH Zurich, with a PhD in 1911, where he studied with Richard Willstätter. In 1912, he became a research assistant at the Kaiser Wilhelm Institute for Chemistry in Berlin, with Richard Willstätter, with whom he explored important insights on the importance of chlorophyll in carbon assimilation.

In 1917, he was appointed professor of chemistry at the Ludwig Maximilian University of Munich. In the same year, he was hired as head of the pharmaceutical department of the Sandoz (now Novartis) chemical factory in Basel. In this company, he was president from 1949 to 1956, Director from 1964 he held the office of President of the Board.

Together with Sandoz employees, he developed a range of methods for producing drugs. Thus, he developed the first isolation of ergot alkaloids (as ergotamine and ergobasine) and cardiac glycosides, which are used as a medicine for heart diseases and migraines. A continuous process for the production of soluble calcium salts was developed. He worked with Albert Hofmann.

Personal life
Stoll also collected modern art, including paintings by Ferdinand Hodler.

Awards
member of the German Academy of Natural Scientists Leopoldina
Foreign member of the Royal Swedish Academy of Sciences
Foreign Member of the Royal Society
1959 Paul Karrer Gold Medal

References

1887 births
1971 deaths
Swiss biochemists
Foreign Members of the Royal Society
Academic staff of ETH Zurich
Academic staff of the Ludwig Maximilian University of Munich
Novartis people